Ipsoot Mountain is a  glaciated summit located in southwest British Columbia, Canada.

Description
Precipitation runoff and glacial meltwater from this large mountain drains into Pemberton, Miller and Rutherford creeks, then eventually Lillooet River. The mountain was named by the first ascent party, and "ipsoot" means "hidden", or "to hide" in Chinook Jargon, as this peak is indeed hidden from view in adjacent valleys. The toponym was officially adopted June 22, 1967, by the Geographical Names Board of Canada.

Climate
Based on the Köppen climate classification, Ipsoot Mountain is located in the marine west coast climate zone of western North America. Most weather fronts originate in the Pacific Ocean, and travel east toward the Coast Mountains where they are forced upward by the range (Orographic lift), causing them to drop their moisture in the form of rain or snowfall. As a result, the Coast Mountains experience high precipitation, especially during the winter months in the form of snowfall. Winter temperatures can drop below −20 °C with wind chill factors below −30 °C. This climate supports the Ipsoot Glacier (also known as the Ipsoot Icefield) on the peak's northwest slope. The months July through September offer the most favorable weather for climbing Ipsoot Mountain.

See also

 Geography of British Columbia
 Geology of British Columbia

References

External links
 Weather: Ipsoot Mountain 

Two-thousanders of British Columbia
Pacific Ranges
Lillooet Land District
Coast Mountains
Pemberton Valley
Chinook Jargon place names
Sea-to-Sky Corridor